Thomas Grieve (7 July 1875 – 28 November 1948) was a professional footballer who played in the Football League for Woolwich Arsenal as an outside right.

Personal life 
Grieve served in the Royal Scots.

Career statistics

References

Scottish footballers
Brentford F.C. players
English Football League players
Association football outside forwards
Northfleet United F.C. players
Gillingham F.C. players
Arsenal F.C. players
Southern Football League players
1875 births
People from Leith
1948 deaths
Watford F.C. players
Brighton & Hove Albion F.C. players
Royal Scots soldiers
Footballers from Edinburgh